The Knights of Pythias is a fraternal organization and secret society founded in Washington, D.C., on . The Knights of Pythias is the first fraternal organization to receive a charter under an act of the United States Congress. It was founded by Justus H. Rathbone, who had been inspired by a play by the Irish poet John Banim about the legend of Damon and Pythias. This legend illustrates the ideals of loyalty, honor, and friendship that are the center of the order.

The order had over 2,000 lodges in the United States and around the world, with a total membership of over 50,000 in 2003.  Some lodges meet in structures referred to as Pythian Castles.

Organization 
The structure of the Knights of Pythias is three-tiered. The local units are called "Subordinate Lodges." State and provincial organizations are called "Grand Lodges" and the national structure is called the "Supreme Lodge" and meets in convention biennially. The officers of the Supreme Lodge include the sitting Past Supreme Chancellor, Chancellor, Vice-Chancellor, Prelate, Secretary, Treasurer, Master at Arms, Inner Guard and Outer Guard.

The order's auxiliaries are the Pythian Sisters, the Dramatic Order of the Knights of Khorassan, and the Nomads of Avrudaka.

Membership 
Membership has historically been open to males in good health who believe in a Supreme Being. Maimed individuals were not admitted until 1875. Members are accepted by blackball ballot.

A member must be at least 18 years of age, and must take the following oath:

By the end of the so-called "Golden Age of Fraternalism" in the early 1920s, the order had nearly a million members. By 1979, however, this number had declined to fewer than 200,000.

Rank structure 
The ranks of Pythian Knighthood in a subordinate lodge (or "Castle") are:
Page
Esquire
Knight

In 1877, the order adopted an optional rank, called the Endowment Rank, which provided fraternal insurance benefits. In 1930, this department split from the Knights of Pythias and became a mutual life insurance company, later known as the "American United Insurance Company".

Finally, members who obtained the rank of Knight were eligible to join the now-defunct Uniform Rank, which participated in parades and other processions.

Sword 
Early in the group's history, when a man was inducted into the Knights of Pythias, he received a ceremonial sword. Such a sword might be given to a Pythian by family members, business associates, or others as a token of esteem.

Markings on swords varied widely. Most swords were inscribed with the initials "FCB", which stand for the Pythian motto ("Friendship, Charity, Benevolence"). Images on swords were also somewhat common, and included: A man, woman, and child (symbolic of Damon saying good-bye to his family); a man looking out of a building, with a group of people below (symbolic of Pythias' pending execution); a man (Samson) between some pillars, pulling them down, or various types of weapons (swords, axes, hammers, etc.). A full Knight of the Pythian order often inscribed his sword with the image of a knight's helmet with a lion on the crest. Many also carried the image of a sprig of myrtle (the Pythian symbol of love) or a falcon (the Pythian symbol of vigilance).

Swords owned by a member of the Uniformed Rank might be inscribed with the initials "UR," a dove, or a lily.

Philanthropy 
The order provides for "worthy Pythians in distress" and has given aid to victims of national or sectional disasters. It runs camps for underprivileged youth and homes for aged members. It has sponsored scholarship funds, blood drives, highway safety programs, and the Cystic Fibrosis Research Foundation.

Other Pythian organizations

Knights of Pythias of North and South America, Europe, Asia, and Africa 
By 1897, the KPNSAEAA had 40,000 members, with Grand Lodges in 20 states and other lodges in the West Indies and Central America. It distributed  worth of benefits annually and had a woman's auxiliary and uniformed rank.

Canada 
Rowena L. Rooks composed "K of P grand march [for piano]," which was dedicated to Collin H. Rose, Grand Chancellor, and the officers and representatives of the Grand Lodge K of P of Ontario, Canada. The march sheet music, which was published in London, Ontario, by C. F. Colwell,  1876, was illustrated with the Knights of Pythias emblem and Latin motto  or, in English, "True friends are a refuge".

Improved Order, Knights of Pythias 
In 1892, the Supreme Lodge ruled that the work of the order would only be conducted in English. This upset some members who were accustomed to using German. After this ruling was reiterated at the Supreme Lodges of 1894 and 1895, a number of German-speaking Pythians split off and formed the Improved Order, Knights of Pythias at a convention in Indianapolis in June 1895. The new order was reportedly not very popular, and a movement toward reconciliation occurred a few years later.

Notable Pythian Knights 

 Granville Pearl Aikman (1858–1923), State of Kansas District Judge and suffragist
 A. A. Ames, four-time mayor of Minneapolis, Minnesota
 Louis Armstrong, jazz trumpeter and singer
 Hugo Black, U.S. Supreme Court Justice
 Clifford Cleveland Brooks, member of the Louisiana State Senate from 1924 to 1932 from northeast Delta parishes
 William Jennings Bryan, U.S. Secretary of State and presidential candidate
 Robert Byrd, U.S. Senator
 Benjamin Cardozo, U.S. Supreme Court Justice

 Leopold Caspari, member of both houses of the Louisiana State Legislature
 Robert E. Lee Chancey, 44th mayor of Tampa.

 Brevet Major Augustus P. Davis, founder of the Sons of Union Veterans of the Civil War

 Eliot Engel, Congressman, New York 
 John W. Grabiel, Republican gubernatorial nominee in Arkansas in 1922 and 1924
 Leroy Milton Grider (1854–1919), California real-estate developer
 Warren G. Harding, U.S. President
 William S. Hayward, mayor of Providence, Rhode Island, co-founder of Citizens Bank
 Charles Tisdale Howard, U.S. Attorney for South Dakota, Speaker of the South Dakota House of Representatives 
 Hubert Horatio Humphrey, U.S. Vice President
 Bob Jones, Sr., founder of Bob Jones University, prominent evangelist
 Claud H. Larsen, member of the Wisconsin State Assembly
 John Ellis Martineau, Governor of Arkansas, U.S. District Judge for the Eastern District of Arkansas
 Frank McDonough, member of both houses of the Wisconsin Legislature
 William McKinley, U.S. President
 Charles W. Miller, 18th Indiana Attorney General
 Oscar H. Montgomery, Justice of the Indiana Supreme Court
 Robert Pfeifle, 3rd mayor of Bethlehem, Pennsylvania
 Alexander P. Riddle lieutenant governor of Kansas
 Bradbury Robinson, pioneering American football player, physician, conservationist, and local politician.
 John Buchanan Robinson, U.S. Congressman from Pennsylvania's 6th congressional district (1891–1897) 
 Nelson A. Rockefeller, U.S. Vice President
 Franklin D. Roosevelt, U.S. President, who joined in 1936, during his presidency
 Charles Schumer, U.S. Senator
 Ele Stansbury, 23rd Indiana Attorney General

 Park Trammell, U.S. Senator from Florida
 Lew Wallace, author, territorial governor of New Mexico, major general (U.S. Army), diplomat

Notable Pythian buildings 

 (by state then city)

 Knights of Pythias Building (Phoenix, Arizona), NRHP-listed 
 Pythian Castle (Arcata, California), in Humboldt County, California, NRHP-listed
 Pythias Lodge Building (San Diego, California), NRHP-listed
 Knights of Pythias Lodge (Salida, Colorado)
 Knights of Pythias Lodge Hall (Weiser, Idaho), NRHP-listed
 Knights of Pythias Building and Theatre, Greensburg, Indiana, NRHP-listed
 Knights of Pythias Lodge (South Bend, Indiana), NRHP-listed
 Knights of Pythias Temple (Louisville, Kentucky), NRHP-listed
 Pythian Temple, New Orleans, Louisiana
 Pythian Opera House, Boothbay Harbor, Maine
 Eagle Harbor Schoolhouse, Eagle Harbor, Michigan, NRHP-listedwhere Justus Rathbone developed the idea and ritual of the order
 Pythian Home of Missouri, also known as Pythian Castle
 Knights of Pythias Building (Virginia City, Nevada)
 Pythian Temple (New York City)
 Pythian Temple and James Pythian Theater, Columbus, Ohio
 Pythian Castle (Toledo, Ohio), NRHP-listed
 Knights of Pythias Pavilion, Franklin, Tennessee, NRHP-listed
 Knights of Pythias Temple (Dallas, Texas), also known as the Union Bankers Building
 Knights of Pythias Building (Fort Worth, Texas), also known as Pythian Castle Hall, NRHP-listed
 Pythian Castle (Portsmouth, Virginia), NRHP-listed
 Pythian Temple (Tacoma, Washington), NRHP-listed
 Knights of Pythias Building (Bellingham (Fairhaven), Washington)
 Pythian Castle Lodge, Milwaukee, Wisconsin, NRHP-listed

In popular culture 
The Knights are mentioned in Sunshine Sketches of a Little Town by Stephen Leacock; an ill-fated marine excursion organised by the Knights is the subject of Chapter 3, entitled "The Marine Excursion of the Knights of Pythias". Several characters in the book are said to be members of the Knights.

In the Marx Brothers movie Animal Crackers, Groucho, as the character Captain Spaulding, reports on his recent big game hunting trip to Africa.  He says, "The principal animals in Africa are moose, elks, and Knights of Pythias."

See also 
Grand Court Order of Calanthe
Knights of the Golden Eagle
Pierce v. Society of Sisters
William Hood House

Notes

References

External links 

 
 Grand Lodge, Knights of Pythias of Missouri
 Knights of Pythias Benjamin N. Cardozo Lodge

1864 establishments in Washington, D.C.
Fraternal orders
 
Organizations established in 1864
Secret societies in the United States